Jean-Yves Le Déroff (born 15 September 1957 in Inezgane, Souss-Massa-Drâa, Morocco) is a French sailor and Olympic champion. He won the Tornado Class at the 1988 Summer Olympics in Seoul, South Korea, with Nicolas Hénard. He also has a silver medal from the 1987 World championship.

References

External links

1957 births
Living people
French male sailors (sport)
Sailors at the 1988 Summer Olympics – Tornado
Olympic sailors of France
Olympic gold medalists for France
Olympic medalists in sailing
Medalists at the 1988 Summer Olympics